is a Japanese manga artist and illustrator. He has also published various dōjinshi under the pen name Inazuma and runs an erotic genre group called Digital Accel Works. He is responsible for the character design and illustration for the Highschool of the Dead manga. He is the former assistant of Kōshi Rikudō, the creator of the popular manga series Excel Saga.

Works
 , Shōnen Gahōsha, 2004
 , Fujimi Shobo, 2007 (illustrator)
 , Fujimi Shobo, 2009
 , Shueisha, 2009
 FIRE FIRE FIRE BLACK SWORD, Home-sha, 2013
 , Fujimi Shobo, 2018 (illustrator)

References

External links
  
  
 

Hentai creators
Manga artists from Ōita Prefecture
Living people
Year of birth missing (living people)